Broth, also known as bouillon, is a savory liquid made of water in which meat, fish or vegetables have been simmered for a short period of time. It can be eaten alone, but it is most commonly used to prepare other dishes, such as soups, gravies, and sauces.

Commercially prepared liquid broths are available, typically chicken, beef, fish, and vegetable varieties. Dehydrated broth in the form of bouillon cubes were commercialized beginning in the early 20th century.

Broths have been used as a nutrition source for the sick in Great Britain since at least the early 1700s, such as for dysentery patients.

Stock versus broth 

Many cooks and food writers use the terms broth and stock interchangeably. In 1974, James Beard wrote that stock, broth, and bouillon "are all the same thing".

While many draw a distinction between stock and broth, the details of the distinction often differ. One possibility is that stocks are made primarily from animal bones, as opposed to meat, and therefore contain more gelatin, giving them a thicker texture. Another distinction that is sometimes made is that stock is cooked longer than broth and therefore has a more intense flavor. A third possible distinction is that stock is left unseasoned for use in other recipes, while broth is salted and otherwise seasoned and can be eaten alone.

Scotch broth is a soup which includes solid pieces of meat and vegetables. Its name reflects an older usage of the term "broth" that did not distinguish between the complete soup and its liquid component.

See also

 Canja de galinha
 Rosół
 Bouillon, a Haitian soup
 Court-bouillon, from the French court or "short broth"

References

External links

Food ingredients
Soups
Stock (food)